Jacqueline Lee Foster (born 14 December 1975) is a Canadian international lawn bowler.

Bowls career

Commonwealth Games
She was born in Middleton, Canada and represented Canada during the 2014 Commonwealth Games.

She was selected as part of the Canadian team for the 2018 Commonwealth Games on the Gold Coast in Queensland where she reached the semi finals of the Fours with Pricilla Westlake, Leanne Chinery and Joanna Cooper.

In 2022, she competed in the women's pairs and the Women's fours at the 2022 Commonwealth Games.

Asia Pacific
Foster has won two medals at the Asia Pacific Bowls Championships, the latest at the 2019 Asia Pacific Bowls Championships in the Gold Coast, Queensland.

World Championships
In 2020 she was selected for the 2020 World Outdoor Bowls Championship in Australia.

References

External links
 Jacqueline Foster at Bowls Canada
 

1975 births
Living people
Canadian female bowls players
Commonwealth Games competitors for Canada
Bowls players at the 2018 Commonwealth Games
Bowls players at the 2022 Commonwealth Games
21st-century Canadian women